Arthur "Art" W. Graham III (Nov 20, 1940 - May 12, 2008) was the Director of Timing & Scoring for the Indianapolis 500 from 1978-1998

A native of Columbus, IN, but a longtime resident of Cincinnati, OH and then Brownsburg, IN. Graham designed and implemented the first fully automated electronic race timing and scoring system and introduced many of the timing-and-scoring innovations now used in American and International open-wheel racing.
 
Graham was also a Computer Engineer for IBM for 30 years from 1962-1992, overseeing the PC Divisions unprecedented growth in home computers. His dual roles with IBM and Indy, birthed a partnership with "Big Blue" and USAC that enabled innovations not seen in other Motorsports.

Indy Racing League 
A lifelong racing enthusiast who recalled watching the first live television coverage of the "500" in 1949 on a tiny screen through an appliance store window, Graham first became involved with the United States Auto Club in 1965 while living in Cincinnati. It wasn't long before he was serving on USAC's various competition commissions, eventually becoming Chairman of the Rules Committee. In 1982 he was named to USAC's Board of Directors, remaining there until 1997 as the Director of Corporate Development.

Computers were being used at Indianapolis when Graham first came onto the scene, but he revolutionized their use into timing & scoring procedures. He designed and installed the first automated system that tracked and communicated drivers position and speed in Real-time. It simultaneously displayed race leaders and laps on the position board. Utilizing proprietary in-track antenna loops and on-car position transponders, the information was automatically fed to live TV broadcasts allowing home viewers to follow the race and position of their favorite drivers.   

For many years prior, it was traditional for an all-night audit of individual manual scoring sheets and DOS-based computers to verify race results, with the results not being officially posted until the following day. By the late 1980s, under Graham's leadership, they would be posted within an hour of the race finish. Graham has been recognized as the "Father of Autosport Timing Technology".

In the early 1990s, Graham began championing the cause of the National Midget Auto Racing Hall of Fame, and later served for several years as the organization's Secretary.

Interests 

A great lover of big-band music, Graham was the Indiana representative of the Four Freshmen Society, and he had put in a considerable amount of effort toward the planning of a 60th anniversary celebration of the group's formation, to be held in Indianapolis in August, 2008.

Family 

Graham is a member of Sigma Alpha Epsilon fraternity, Indiana Beta '62.  His family includes wife Dina, daughter Susan L. Moore, sons Daniel A. and Matthew S. Graham, brother Andrew S. Graham, mother Martha S. Graham, and four grandchildren, Sydney, Reagan, Taylor and Kyle.

References

External links

United States Auto Club
Indianapolis Motor Speedway
Indianapolis 500
National Midget Auto Racing Hall of Fame
Indy Racing League

1940 births
2008 deaths
Auto racing executives
Indianapolis 500
Systems engineers

fi:USAC